All Saints' Church is a Church of England Parish Church in Sandon, Hertfordshire, England. It is listed Grade I.

History 
At the time of the Domesday Book, Sandon was one of a number of manors in Hertfordshire which belonged to St Paul's Cathedral. The manor remained in the cathedral's ownership until the 19th century. 
The cathedral entered into a contract in 1348 to rebuild the chancel of All Saints'. This appears to be the earliest surviving part of the present church.

References 

Grade I listed churches in Hertfordshire
Churches in Hertfordshire
Buildings and structures in North Hertfordshire District